The Wardak Vase is an ancient globular-shaped buddhist copper vase that was found as part of a stupa relic deposit in the early nineteenth century in the Wardak Province of Afghanistan. The importance of the vase lies in the long Kharoshthi inscription which dates the objects to around 178 AD and claims that the stupa contained the sacred relics of the Buddha. Since 1880, the vase has been part of the British Museum's Asian collection.

Discovery
The vase, coins and other relics were found by the British adventurer and archaeologist Charles Masson in 1836. Unusually, Masson did not supervise the excavation himself and did not provide details of exactly where the individual artefacts were found. The finds arrived in London in 1839, where they became part of the Indian Museum's collection. In 1880, they were transferred to the British Museum.

Description
The Wardak Vase is spherical in shape and made of copper alloy. The vase has a slim neck with an inverted rim and a low flat base. It has a series of three parallel grooves running around the middle of the vase and a second set of grooves running around the vase just below the neck. Engraved on the shoulder of the vase between the upper and lower grooves are three lines of Kharoshthi script. Below the lower set of grooves is a fourth line in larger letters. The text dates the vase and deposits to around 178 AD. With the vase were found a number of beads and sixty-six coins. The coins have not been identified among the museum's collection. Masson mentions that they were of the "Indo-Scythic class", which implies that they would have been of the Kushan kings Vima Kadphises, Kanishka I and Huvishka.

Inscription
The long inscription refers to the Kushan year 51; Kanishka I reigned c. AD 127 to 151. The text mentions Kanishka's successor Huvishka who ruled c. AD 151 to 190; it thus provides useful evidence for reconstructing the chronological reigns of the Kushan royalty. The inscription also indicates that the  monastery was built by the Mahasanghikas, one of the earliest buddhist schools in India, who were based at Mathura, near Delhi. The vase therefore provides evidence for the widespread distribution of Buddhism in South Asia almost 2000 years ago.

Similar vase
The description of a similar vase that is privately owned was published in 2008. It bears a closely related inscription and the original content has been conserved. The Kharoshthi inscription records that the relics were consecrated on the same day in Kanishka year 51 (c. AD 178) by the daughter of "Vagamarega", the donor of the Wardak Vase. The contents of the vase included a relic container made of silver, a folded sheet of birch bark and 21 coins. Of these, 19 were Kushan bronze coins but two were much later Napki Malka silver coins of the Nezak Huns indicating that the relics had been re-deposited in the 5th–6th century.

Notes

References

Sources

Further reading
Errington, E., and J. Cribb (eds), The Crossroads of Asia: (Cambridge, Ancient India and Iran Trust, 1992)

Asian objects in the British Museum
Buddhist art
Buddhist reliquaries
Buddhism in Afghanistan
Individual vases
Afghanistan–United Kingdom relations
Archaeological discoveries in Afghanistan